Pseudosmodingium virletii is a species of flowering plant in the family Anacardiaceae, native to northeastern and central Mexico. A shrub, it can be found in dry scrublands and forests.

References

Anacardiaceae
Endemic flora of Mexico
Flora of Northeastern Mexico
Flora of Central Mexico
Plants described in 1881